Leon Stuart Gregory  (born 23 November 1932) was an Australian athlete who competed mainly in the 400 metres.

He competed for Australia in the 1956 Summer Olympics held in Melbourne, Australia in the 4 × 400 metre relay where he won the Silver medal with his team mates Graham Gipson, David Lean and Kevan Gosper.  He won the national championship in 1951 and 1955.

References

1932 births
Living people
Australian male sprinters
Olympic silver medalists for Australia
Athletes (track and field) at the 1956 Summer Olympics
Olympic athletes of Australia
Medalists at the 1956 Summer Olympics
Olympic silver medalists in athletics (track and field)
Recipients of the Medal of the Order of Australia